The 1924 North Dakota gubernatorial election was held on November 4, 1924.

Incumbent Republican Governor Ragnvald A. Nestos was defeated for re-nomination in the Republican primary.

Republican nominee Arthur G. Sorlie defeated Democratic nominee Halvor L. Halvorson with 53.93% of the vote.

Primary elections
Primary elections were held on June 25, 1924.

Democratic primary

Candidates
Halvor L. Halvorson, Democratic candidate for North Dakota's 3rd congressional district in 1912, 1914 and 1918
Dr. L. S. Platou, unsuccessful candidate for Democratic nomination for Governor in 1916 and 1922

Results

Republican primary

Candidates
Ingram J. Moe, head of the North Dakota Good Roads association and former mayor of Valley City
Ragnvald A. Nestos, incumbent Governor (supported by the Independent Voters Association)
Arthur G. Sorlie, member of the Grand Forks City Council (supported by the Nonpartisan League)

Results

General election

Candidates
Halvor L. Halvorson, Democratic
Arthur G. Sorlie, Republican

Results

References

Bibliography
 

1924
North Dakota
Gubernatorial
November 1924 events